Raymond Dandy (1887–1953) was a French actor.

Selected filmography
 Take Care of Amelie (1932)
 Fifty Fathoms Deep (1932)
 Three Waltzes (1938)

1887 births
1953 deaths
French male film actors
Senegalese male film actors
20th-century French male actors